"La Luz" (English: "The Light") is a song by Mexican singer Thalía and Puerto Rican rapper Myke Towers, from Thalía's seventeenth studio album Desamorfosis. It was released by Sony Music Latin on August 28, 2020.

Background and release
The song was released on August 28, 2020 onto mainstream radio and all digital platforms. Thalía stated that she recorded the song thinking of her audience and how the song could raise their levels of positivism and happiness.

Music video
The music video was released on the same day as the song. The video was directed by Ariel Danziger, filmed in New York and San Juan, and shows the singers in a rustic scenery full of neon lights and special effects. The video got over 95 thousand views in its first few hours.

Charts

Weekly charts

Year-end charts

References

Thalía songs
2020 singles
Spanish-language songs
2020 songs
Myke Towers songs